Ceratorhiza hydrophila is an anamorphic species of fungus in the family Ceratobasidiaceae. It is a plant pathogen, formerly known as Sclerotium hydrophilum, causing Globular Sclerotial Disease in rice.

References

External links 
 USDA ARS Fungal Database

Fungal plant pathogens and diseases
Rice diseases
Cantharellales